Akseli Lankinen (born ) is a Finnish male volleyball player. He is part of the Finland men's national volleyball team. He competed at the 2015 European Games in Baku. On club level he plays for Kuortane Lentopallo.

References

1997 births
Living people
Finnish men's volleyball players
Volleyball players at the 2015 European Games
European Games competitors for Finland
Place of birth missing (living people)